The 6th constituency of the Hauts-de-Seine is a French legislative constituency in the Hauts-de-Seine département.

Description

Hauts-de-Seine's 6th constituency lies between the Seine and the Boulevard Périphérique bordered to the north by Hauts-de-Seine's 5th constituency. It includes the wealthy suburb of Neuilly-sur-Seine the political base of former President of France Nicolas Sarkozy.

The seat has been staunchly conservative for its entire history. Its former deputy Jean-Christophe Fromantin founded his own minor party Territoires en mouvement of which he is the only elected member.

Historic Representative

Election results

2022

 
 
 
 
 
 
 
 
 
 
 
|-
| colspan="8" bgcolor="#E9E9E9"|
|-

2017

 
 
 
 
 
 
 
 
|-
| colspan="8" bgcolor="#E9E9E9"|
|-

2012

 
 
 
 
 
 
|-
| colspan="8" bgcolor="#E9E9E9"|
|-

2007

 
 
 
 
 
 
|-
| colspan="8" bgcolor="#E9E9E9"|
|-

2002

 
 
 
 
 
|-
| colspan="8" bgcolor="#E9E9E9"|
|-

1997

 
 
 
 
 
 
|-
| colspan="8" bgcolor="#E9E9E9"|
|-

Sources

 Official results of French elections from 1998: 

6